Cornelius Herman "Cor" Edskes (7 August 1925 – 7 September 2015) was a Dutch organbuilder and organologist who was one of the most important authorities on the history of organ building in Northern Europe. He acted as the consultant for the restoration of many of Europe's most important historical organs, including those in the Nieuwe Kerk (Amsterdam) and Roskilde Cathedral (both working with the firm Marcussen & Son). 

Born in Groningen, Edskes had a working relationship with the German organ builder Jürgen Ahrend that began in the 1950s, included the restoration of many organs in Germany and Holland, and culminated in the restoration of Arp Schnitger's largest surviving organ at St. Jacobi, Hamburg. Edskes was the major onscreen contributor to the documentary Martinikerk Rondeau, in which he detailed the history of organs in and around Groningen.

He died in Haren, aged 90.

References

External links
Interview
Information about Martinikerk Rondeau

1925 births
2015 deaths
20th-century Dutch historians
Organs (music)
People from Groningen (city)